Henry Barber was an 18th-century British sea captain, credited with the discovery of McKean Island, in the Phoenix group in the Pacific Ocean.

Sailing history
Barber operated merchant routes from India and America to the new settlement at Port Jackson. 

Barber was responsible for the first recorded western shipwreck in the Hawaiian Islands. On October 31, 1796, the British brig Arthur, commanded by Captain Henry Barber, struck a coral shoal off what is now called Barbers Point, O‘ahu, and was driven onto the rocks. Six of the twenty-two men aboard were swept to their deaths while struggling to get a boat off.

Discovery of McKean Island

Captain Barber made four voyages to the Pacific North West between 1794 and 1804. While captaining the British ship Arthur on a journey from Botany Bay, New South Wales to the north-west coast of America in 1794, Barber discovered what is believed to be McKean Island. Sighting the uninhabited island on 28 May, Barber named it "Drummond's Island", plotting it at 3°40'S, 176°51'W.  The Albany Sentinel reported that the "small sandy island...is very low and cannot be seen from the deck of a vessel more than five or six miles".  It was later named 'Arthur Island' and appeared as such in Arrowsmith's charts of the time located at 3°30'S, 176°0'W. The closest island to these coordinates is McKean Island at 3°35'S, 174°02'W, which was renamed and mapped by Charles Wilkes of the United States Exploring Expedition 1838-1842. However, Arthur Island remained suspected and 'in need of confirmation' until at least 1871, when it was listed in Findlay's Directory, using the charts of cartographer John Arrowsmith.

Notes

References
 Maude, H.E., (1968) Of Islands and Men: Studies in Pacific History, Melbourne: Oxford University Press
 Quanchi, Max & Robson, John, (2005); Historical Dictionary of the Discovery and Exploration of the Pacific Islands, USA: Scarecrow Press, 
 Sharp, Andrew (1960); The Discovery of the Pacific Islands, Oxford:Oxford University Press,

Year of birth missing
Year of death missing
British sailors
British explorers of the Pacific
History of Kiribati
Fur traders